Lloyd Emmett Johnson (born January 22, 1945) was a Canadian politician. He served in the Legislative Assembly of Saskatchewan from 1975 to 1982, as a NDP member for the constituency of Turtleford. He is a farmer.

He also represented Shellbrook-Spiritwood from 1995 to 1999.

References

Saskatchewan New Democratic Party MLAs
1945 births
Living people
People from North Battleford